Paula Newton (born 1968 in Hamilton, Ontario) is an international correspondent with CNN and CNN International based in Ottawa covering stories in Canada since 2007. Newton is a former reporter for Canadian network CTV from 1993 to 2005. At CTV, Newton worked at various positions including:

 Atlantic affairs reporter in Halifax, Nova Scotia
 Quebec affairs correspondent in Montreal, Quebec
 National affairs correspondent, Ottawa, Ontario
 Moscow bureau chief
 Anchor on Canada AM
 Anchor on Question Period
 Anchor on CTV Newsnet

Before CTV, Newton worked as:
 parliamentary producer for Independent Satellite News 1986–1989, Ottawa, Ontario
 anchor and reporter for CHCH-TV 1989–1991, Hamilton, Ontario
 reporter for the Atlantic Television System 1991–1993, Halifax, Nova Scotia

She has also started filling in for anchors in London. She has been seen doing such shows as CNN Today, Inside the Middle East, Quest Means Business, CNN Business Traveller and World News Europe.

She often fills in for Kim Brunhuber on CNN Newsroom's European breakfast edition.

External links
 CNN Profile
 CNN Appoints Newton as International Correspondent for London

Canadian expatriates in England
Canadian television reporters and correspondents
Journalists from Ontario
Living people
Carleton University alumni
McMaster University alumni
Canadian women television journalists
People from Hamilton, Ontario
CNN people
1968 births